Technopark is a technology park in Thiruvananthapuram, Kerala, India. Established on 18 November 1990 by the Government of Kerala, under chief minister E K Nayanar, it is one the largest information technology (IT) park in India in terms of developed area.

The policy of economic liberalisation initiated by the government of India in 1991, and the rapid growth of the global software industry during the 1990s, substantially contributed to this growth. During the global financial crisis of 2007–2010, the park saw a period of reduced growth in 2009–10, when exports were only 2.8% more than the previous year. During the 2016-17 financial year, the park recorded IT exports of Rs. 5,000 crores.

Technopark is owned and administered by the Government of Kerala and is headed by a chief executive officer. In addition to this, it has a Governing Council and a Project Implementation Board, both of which include top officials of the government. Administrative offices, including that of the CEO, are housed in the Park Centre building. Technopark also hosts a Technology Business Incubation Cell under Kerala Startup Mission.

Technopark houses domestic firms, joint ventures, and subsidiaries of foreign companies engaged in a wide variety of activities, which include embedded software development, smart card technology, enterprise resource planning (ERP), process control software design, engineering and computer-aided design software development, IT Enabled Services (ITES), process re-engineering, animation, and e-business.

History and mission
Then Chief minister of Kerala, E. K. Nayanar visited the Apple facility in the United States in 1989. This led to form Technopark, India's first IT park and still remains the largest in India. Nayanar laid the foundation stone on 1990, after it was registered under the  Travancore Cochin Scientific and Charitable Societies Act. As of 2020, the IT park employs 70,000 people and provide indirect employment to lakhs. In March 1990, the Government of Kerala conceptualised Technopark as a facility to foster the development of high-technology industries in the state. Technopark was set up under the auspices of Electronics Technology Park, Kerala—an autonomous body under the Department of Information Technology of the government of Kerala.

Technopark's aim was to create infrastructure to support the development of high-technology companies.
On 31 March 1991, the foundation stone for Technopark was laid by E K Nayanar, Chief Minister of Kerala, at a ceremony presided over by K R Gowri Amma, Minister for Industries. Technopark was formally dedicated to the nation by the then Prime Minister, P.V. Narasimha Rao, in November, 1995.

Since then, Technopark has been growing steadily both in size and employee strength. Park Centre, Pamba, and Periyar were the only buildings constructed in the beginning, by 1995. Since then, Technopark has periodically added new buildings, such as Nila (1997), Gayathri, and Bhavani. With the inauguration of the  "Thejaswini", on 22 February 2007, Technopark became the largest IT Park in India. After that, Leela Group has built a facility, "Leela Infopark", that hosts MNCs like Allianz, Oracle Corporation, D+H, RM Education, and Zafin.

Socio-economic impact
Technopark has become the single largest source of employment in Kerala, with over thirty thousand people directly working in the facility.

Workforce
Technopark hosts about 460 companies, and a workforce that numbers more than 63,000 personnel, in the IT and ITES sectors: companies such as Allianz–Cornhill, Ernst & Young, Infosys, Navigant India, Oracle Corporation, QuEST Global, RR Donnelly, SunTec Business Solutions, Tata Consultancy Services (TCS), Tata Elxsi, Toonz Animation, and UST Global, as well as Finastra, H&R Block, IBS Software Services, Nissan Global Digital Hub, RM Education, Envestnet, TechMahindra and Way.com.

Institutions

Technopark hosts two educational and research institutes. The Indian Institute of Information Technology and Management, Kerala, (IIITM–K) is an institution of higher education and research and development in applied Information Technology and Management. Portals for computational chemistry and agricultural information dissemination are among its areas of focus. IIITM–K is located at present in Park Centre.

The Asian School of Business (ASB) used to have its flagship post-graduate management programme in Technopark, before moving it to its own 16 Acre LEED-certified campus in 2011. The Asian School of Business is managed by a board of governors, which includes Tata Consultancy Services CEO S. Ramadorai and Infosys CEO Kris Gopalakrishnan.

Infrastructure
Technopark aims to provide the infrastructure and support facilities needed for IT/ITES and electronics companies to function. In addition to office space, it provides utilities and connectivity, which is done either directly or through private partners. Besides, Technopark provides business incubation facilities for start-up firms as well as some social infrastructure for the personnel working in the park.

Buildings

There are currently about a dozen buildings on the Technopark campus intended for software development. There are also independent buildings of private enterprises inside the Phase I campus: Amstor House, Padmanabham, and M-squared.

Other facilities in the campus include:
 Technopark Club – Includes a gym, swimming pool, restaurant, and sporting facilities.
 Technomall – a shopping complex
 Technopark guesthouse
 Private IT parks of individual companies
 Special Economic Zones (SEZ)
 Technology Business Incubator
 WiFi Solutions IT Rentals Infrastructure Service Provider

Utilities and support facilities
Technopark infrastructure facilities include power backup, uninterrupted water supply, and ambient air conditioning; for all buildings. 100% of electric power is available from the Kerala State Electricity Board Limited (KSEBL) and the diesel generators operate with less than 5% annual downtime (with at least 95% uptime, generating electricity). Technopark has its own 110kV electric transformer substation and a 25 mega volt-ampere dedicated internal power distribution system with built-in redundancies at all levels. The water supply is maintained through a dedicated water distribution system.

Technopark has other support facilities such as a satellite earth station, a 200-seater convention centre, a club, a guest house, a shopping complex (Techno-Mall), banks, ATMs, restaurants and conference rooms on campus. Furthermore, setting up of new units is accelerated by exemption from state-level clearances as well as through ready-to-use incubation facilities.

Transport facility
Technopark Express service is a public transport system for Technopark employees. It was inaugurated on 17 April 2017 by Hrishikesh R Nair, the then CEO of Technopark, Infopark, and Cyberpark.

Connectivity
Technopark offers multiple Internet Service Providers, including Reliance Infocomm, STPI, BSNL, Bhari, and VSNL. Leased-line fiber connectivity is available to all buildings on the campus, guaranteeing that connection breaks are a thing of the past.

FLAG Telecom—a subsidiary of Reliance Infocomm—has its FALCON global cable system at Thiruvananthapuram, providing direct connectivity to the Maldives and Sri Lanka. Technopark is connected through fibre link, with a self-healing redundant ring architecture, to Reliance Internet's data center and gateway at Mumbai, directly connecting to FLAG, the undersea cable system backbone that connects 134 countries including the U.S., U.K., and other countries, in North America, Europe, the Middle East, South East Asia, and Asia Pacific.

Technopark Business Incubation Centre (T-BIC)
The Kerala Startup Mission, formerly known as the Technopark Business Incubation Centre (T-BIC), aims to provide economical plug-and-play facilities to start-ups in the IT/ITES fields. This facility has given rise to over 47 successful ventures, many of whom have expanded by taking up space elsewhere in Technopark. T-BIC currently has . (800 sq m.) at Park Centre, and this is being expanded with another . (1000 sq m.) in the newest Technopark building, Thejaswini.
One of the latest companies started at T-BIC is Entiresoft Technologies Private Limited.

Expansion and new projects

Phase II

Technopark has acquired  of land, for its Phase II expansion.
It plans to set up  in the first phase.
 UST Global was to set up a  campus to be completed by 2015.  of space was to be completed by January 2012. Work on the campus was started on 24 October 2007.
 Tata Consultancy Services has been allotted  within the campus for their software development centre.
The first phase of the campus was inaugurated on 23 October 2007.
 Tata Elxsi Limited, which is the product design arm of the US$68 billion Tata Group, has taken  on which to build its design and development centre. The first phase of the campus was commissioned on 7 September 2007.
 The NeST group has also been allocated land to build a development centre, on which work has almost been completed.
 OXOMO Systems International is one of the fastest-growing IT company in the area, concentrating on software development, Digital Marketing, and IT outsourcing sectors.

Technopark Phase III

Firms like Larsen & Toubro and the Rahejas are planning major developments within and around Technopark as well. L&T has already announced its plans to set up a  hybrid IT-and-residential park as part of Technopark Phase III. iGate (formerly Patni Computer Systems) has already announced that it will set up a Rs 150 crore ($US 32 million) development centre in Phase III.

The second and third phases of expansion of Technopark along with the ramping up of operations of the existing IT units are expected to see an investment of around Rs. 3000–4000 crore (US$0.75 billion) and an additional creation of 80,000–100,000 jobs.

Phase IV expansion – Technocity

The fourth phase of Technopark is also referred to as the "Technocity" project. It will be a self-contained IT township with the potential to employ 100,000 people. The expected investment in the project is around Rs 60 billion (over US$1.5 billion), according to 2007 estimates.

The government of Kerala has decided to partner with multiple private developers for Technocity and has formed a special company – Kerala State Information Technology Infrastructure Limited (KSITIL) – to take up the work.  of the project area has already been acquired. A Request for Qualification was issued on 1 June 2008, and nine major developers, including international majors Emaar and Forest City Enterprises, have applied for qualification.

Special Economic Zones in Technopark

There are three Special Economic Zones (SEZs) inside Technopark. Each economic zone encompasses one of Phases I, II, or III. Phase IV will also become an SEZ once land acquisition is completed and will provide a range of economic benefits to the companies operating within Technopark.

Technopark Club
A sports and recreation club on the campus of Phase I provides diverse facilities for professionals to unwind. These include a gym; a swimming pool; and courts for basketball, badminton, table tennis, and beach volleyball. The Club supports tour operators in organising recreational travel of employees and their families; it also has a massage parlour, Vaisakha, and a multi-cuisine restaurant.

Technopark Adventure Club

The Technopark Adventure Club provides adventure activities to employees of Technopark and their families. It organises activities such as parasailing, rock climbing, rappelling, trekking and camping, paragliding.  It administers a camp at Munnar, as well as corporate training camps.

Tech-A-Break
Tech-A-Break is Technopark's annual cultural extravaganza. Typically held over the course of a week, it kicks off with a Carnival parade and ends with performance by professional bands, dance groups, and musicians.

In popular culture
The climactic scenes of the 1997 Malayalam film Superman were filmed in Technopark's Travancore Hall.

The 2009 Malayalam film Ritu was extensively shot on the Technopark campus.

See also
 InfoPark, Kochi
 Kazhakoottam Railway Station
 Techno-lodge
 Technopark Kollam

Notes

External links

 Technopark.org - Technopark official website

1990 establishments in Kerala
Organisations based in Thiruvananthapuram
Science and technology in Thiruvananthapuram
Software technology parks in Kerala
Government-owned companies of Kerala